The Clurit class are a class of domestically designed and built fast attack craft operated by the Indonesian Navy. Vessels of this class are named after indigenous weapons and swords used in Indonesia.

History
The Clurit class was built by PT Palindo Marine Shipyard, Tanjunguncang, Batam. The Clurit is named after a curved blade weapon native to the Madurese people of East Java.

Another ship with the same specifications was commissioned by the Indonesian Navy in February 2012, named KRI Kujang 642. Two more had been commissioned by the end of 2013, with a total of nine planned by the end of 2014. Three of the new vessels are being constructed by PT Palindo Marine Shipyard, with nearby PT Citra Shipyard working on the fourth.

Design
The Clurit prioritizes the element of surprise, rapid strike, destroying multiple targets at once and avoidance. She has a crew of 35.

The first four of the class were originally armed with just a Denel (Vektor) 20mm cannon and two 12.7 mm machine guns. In May 2014 the Clurit and Kujang were fitted with a Chinese made six-barrelled NG-18 30mm CIWS and two of the new C-705 SSM, although Jane's states that they can each carry four such missiles. Although the first C-705 have been fitted, it is not clear when they will become operational.

Ships of class

See also 
 Celurit or Clurit

References

External links
 KRI Clurit on TNI-AL's (Indonesian Navy) website
 KRI Clurit (641) - KCR 40

 
Missile boat classes
Missile boats of the Indonesian Navy
2011 ships